|}

This is a list of results for the Legislative Council at the 1973 South Australian state election.

Results by District

Central No. 1

Central No. 2

Midland

Northern

Southern

See also
 1973 South Australian state election
 Candidates of the 1973 South Australian state election
 Members of the South Australian Legislative Council, 1973–1975

References

1973
1973 elections in Australia
1970s in South Australia